Barnsley East is a constituency in South Yorkshire, represented since 2017 by Stephanie Peacock of the Labour Party.

Constituency profile
The seat covers the south-east suburbs of Barnsley and former coal mining areas such as Hoyland, Darfield and Wombwell. Its residents are poorer than the UK average.

History
The seat was created as Barnsley East in 1983 and abolished to create Barnsley East and Mexborough in 1997. It was recreated as Barnsley East at the 2010 general election.

Eight candidates competed for the seat in the 2010 general election; however, the largest two opposition parties failed to gain more than 18.2% each and the winning candidate Michael Dugher managed to obtain 47% of all votes despite the presence of a candidate from the Socialist Labour Party. Although the percentage decline in the Labour vote was the largest in the country (at nearly 24%), they still won the seat safely. In 2017, Stephanie Peacock succeeded Dugher as MP for Barnsley East.

Both between 1983 and 1997, and at the 2010 general election, this constituency has been a safe seat for the Labour Party, as indeed was its temporary replacement, Barnsley East and Mexborough. After the 2019 general election however, this constituency became a marginal seat, with Labour's vote share dropping by 21.9% and their majority cut to just 8.4%.

Boundaries

1983–1997: The Metropolitan Borough of Barnsley wards of Brierley, Cudworth, Darfield, Dearne South, Dearne Thurnscoe, Wombwell North, and Wombwell South.

2010–present: The Metropolitan Borough of Barnsley wards of Cudworth, Darfield, Hoyland Milton, North East, Rockingham, Stairfoot, Wombwell, and Worsbrough.

Following their review of parliamentary representation in South Yorkshire for the 2010 general election, the Boundary Commission for England divided the existing Barnsley East and Mexborough seat to split off Barnsley East from Mexborough, to create the new Barnsley East constituency.

Members of Parliament

MPs 1983–1997

MPs since 2010

Elections

Elections in the 2010s

Elections in the 1990s
Following the death of Terry Patchett on 11 October 1996, a by-election was held on 12 December 1996. The replacement Labour candidate Jeff Ennis held the seat for the party despite a low voter turnout.

Elections in the 1980s

See also
List of parliamentary constituencies in South Yorkshire

Notes

References

Sources 
BBC Election 2005
BBC Vote 2001
Guardian Unlimited Politics (Election results from 1992 to the present)

Politics of Barnsley
Parliamentary constituencies in Yorkshire and the Humber
Constituencies of the Parliament of the United Kingdom established in 1983
Constituencies of the Parliament of the United Kingdom disestablished in 1997
Constituencies of the Parliament of the United Kingdom established in 2010